Bettye Louise Ackerman (February 28, 1924 – November 1, 2006) was an American actress primarily known for her work on television.

Early years
Ackerman was born in Cottageville, South Carolina (another source says she was born in Williston, South Carolina), the daughter of Clarence Kilgo Ackerman and Mary Baker Ackerman, and grew up in Williston, in Barnwell County in southwestern South Carolina, one of four children. She graduated from Columbia College in South Carolina in 1945 and left for New York City soon after. She studied theater at the graduate level at Columbia University in New York and pursued art studies with Joseph Mugnaini and George DeGroat at Otis Art Institute in Los Angeles.

Television
From 1961 until 1966, Ackerman played Dr. Maggie Graham on the ABC medical drama Ben Casey. She played Anne Frazer on Bracken's World and the original Constance MacKenzie on the daytime program Return to Peyton Place. She appeared in an early episode of prime time soap Falcon Crest portraying the character of Elisabeth Bradbury. She also appeared in two episodes of Perry Mason, starring Raymond Burr: in 1965. she played the role of Amy Reid in the episode, "The Case of the Thermal Thief," and in 1966. she played Laura Brandon in "The Case of the Positive Negative." In 1977, she appeared in "Never Con a Killer," the pilot for the ABC crime drama The Feather and Father Gang.

Stage
Ackerman played the title role in the one act play Salome, by Oscar Wilde, as part of the Alexander Kirkland Acting Group. The production was released on Magic-Tone Records (CTG 4011). Ackerman's Broadway credits include A Meeting by the River (1979).

Film
Ackerman's film debut came in Face of Fire in 1959.

Personal life
On June 7, 1956, Ackerman, at 32, married her future Ben Casey co-star Sam Jaffe, who was then 65. Although there was a 33-year difference in their ages, the couple had a very successful and happy marriage until Jaffe died of cancer in 1984. They had no children.

She sold her home in Beverly Hills, California, and returned to South Carolina to be near her large extended family in 1998. Shortly afterwards, she was diagnosed with Alzheimer's disease.

Ackerman was also a noted artist, who had numerous exhibits in both Beverly Hills and Columbia, South Carolina.

Death
Ackerman died November 1, 2006, after having suffered a stroke in Columbia, South Carolina. She was 82.

She is buried in Williston Cemetery in South Carolina.

Filmography

Movies
Face of Fire (1959) as Grace Trescott
Companions in Nightmare (1968, TV Movie) as Sara Nicholson
Rascal (1969) as Miss Whalen
Ted & Venus (1991) as Poetry Award Presenter

Television
Ben Casey (ABC) (1961–1966) as Dr. Maggie Graham
Breaking Point  (ABC) as Eunice Osment in "Better Than a Dead Lion" (1964)
Bracken's World (NBC) (1970) as Anne Frazer, Bracken's secretary
The Sixth Sense (ABC) (1972) as Helene, a piano instructor, and mother of a psychic, who attempts murder
Gunsmoke (CBS) as Zisha in "This Golden Land" (1973)
The New Adventures of Wonder Woman (CBS) as Asclepia in "The Return of Wonder Woman" (1977) 
Falcon Crest (CBS) as Elisabeth Bradbury in "For Love or Money" (1982)

References

External links

American television actresses
Actresses from Columbia, South Carolina
People from Williston, South Carolina
Actresses from Beverly Hills, California
1924 births
2006 deaths
20th-century American actresses
American film actresses
Columbia College (South Carolina) alumni
American United Methodists
People from Colleton County, South Carolina
20th-century Methodists